Pleasure is the third studio album by American funk band Ohio Players and the second released through the Westbound label in December 1972.

History
Pleasure continues with vocal harmonies more reminiscent of earlier work than what they would do when they moved to Mercury two years later, and would often show jazz tendencies with some of their musical arrangements.  The songs are a mixture of radio-friendly material with songs that come off as late night studio jam sessions, such as "Walt's First Trip".

The song "Funky Worm" was released as a single and went to #1 on the Billboard R&B charts, their biggest hit during their time with Westbound.  The song, about a unique worm that enjoyed going in mysterious places, would later be sampled by a number of producers in hip-hop and R&B during the late 1980s and early 1990s.

The single and album mixes of "Funky Worm" are slightly different, most notably the opening drum break and the synthesizer solo that represents the sound of the worm.  Upon listening to hip-hop and R&B songs that have sampled it, one can detect if they used the single or album version.

The album was produced by the band, and engineered by Arlen Smith.  The cover photo was taken by Joel Brodsky.

Track listing

Personnel
Ohio Players – producers, arrangements
Arlen Smith – engineer
David Krieger – art direction
Joel Brodsky – photography
Mia Krinsky – album co-ordination
Bob Scerbo – art production supervision

Charts

Singles

References

External links
 Pleasure at Discogs

1972 albums
Ohio Players albums
Westbound Records albums
Albums with cover art by Joel Brodsky